Return of the Living Dead 3 is a 1993 horror comedy film directed by Brian Yuzna and written by John Penney. It is the third film in the Return of the Living Dead film series, following Return of the Living Dead Part II (1988).

Plot
Five years after the events of the previous film, Curt Reynolds steals his father's security key card, and he and his girlfriend, Julie Walker, explore the military base where his father works. They observe Curt's father, Colonel John Reynolds, Col. Peck and Lt. Col. Sinclair overseeing an experiment with a deceased body.

The corpse is exposed to 2-4-5 Trioxin gas, which re-animates the corpse into a zombie. The military hopes to use zombies in combat. However, they are impossible to control as their hunger for human brains causes them to constantly attack.

To deter the zombies' vicious nature, Sinclair suggests permanently attaching the zombies to exoskeletons that will immobilize them when they are not in battle. Reynolds prefers a method referred to as "paretic infusion", which involves firing a chemical projectile into the forehead of the zombie. This causes an endothermic reaction, freezing the zombie's brain and temporarily immobilizing it.

When the paretic infusion method is tested on the zombie in the lab, it is only successful for a few moments, wearing off much faster than expected; the zombie breaks free and attacks a scientist, biting his fingers off before bashing his head against a wall, killing him. Infected by the zombie's bite, the scientist re-animates and attacks another technician. The initial zombie and the reanimated scientist are paralyzed with bullets and the survivors in the room are quarantined. Reynolds is removed from the project and reassigned to Oklahoma City, while Sinclair is promoted to head of the project.

Reynolds informs Curt that they will be moving, something they have done multiple times, but Curt refuses. He rides off on his motorcycle with Julie. While they are speeding down the road, Julie playfully grabs Curt's crotch, causing him to lose control of the motorcycle. Julie is thrown from the bike into a telephone pole; the impact kills her.

Curt brings Julie's corpse to the military base. Using his father's key card, he accesses the Trioxin gas to reanimate her. This leads to Julie and Curt dealing with the effects of Julie being dead - not feeling pain and having no desire to eat normal food - and what they are to do about her condition.

Julie becomes hungry and Curt drives them to a store. A gang talk about her as she is eating snacks on the floor. Curt becomes angry and accidentally hits one of them. During the ensuing brawl one of the gang shoots the shopkeeper. Julie bites the shooter. The alarm goes off and the gang flees. While Curt and Julie are in a van with the wounded shopkeeper, Julie is overcome by her hunger for brains and attacks him, eating some of his brains before Curt stops her.

The gang chases Julie and Curt through the city, not realizing what is happening to their infected friend. Julie and Curt hide from the gang in the sewers, where they encounter Riverman, a vagrant who shelters them. Julie discovers that extreme pain seems to temporarily make the cravings to feed on humans go away. She mutilates her flesh with various items of junk found around Riverman's lair, until she is adorned with spikes, nails, and shards of glass sticking out of her flesh.

The gang tracks Julie and Curt down. Julie seduces the gang leader, then kills him and uses her new decorations to kill the rest of the gang. Julie's body becomes accustomed to the pain, and she turns on Riverman, infecting and killing him. The gang re-animates before the military arrive and neutralizes all of the zombies.

When the zombies are captured, Curt realizes Julie is going to be used as a weapon and goes into a rage, freeing the zombies which then kill the soldiers. In the commotion the base is set on fire and Curt is bitten. Curt's father tries to get Curt to leave but he realizes that he would be abandoning Julie, and also knows he is infected. Curt brings Julie to the furnace; when she asks where they are, Curt says "where we belong", and they kiss one last time before dying by immolation.

Cast
 Kent McCord as Colonel John Reynolds
 Melinda Clarke as Julie Walker (as Mindy Clarke)
 J. Trevor Edmond as Curt Reynolds
 James T. Callahan as Colonel Peck
 Sarah Douglas as Lieutenant Colonel Sinclair
 Abigail Lenz as Mindy
 Basil Wallace as "Riverman"
 Jill Andre as Dr. Beers 
 Billy Kane as Waters 
 Mike Moroff as Santos Morales
 Fabio Urena as Mogo Entvaz
 Pia Reyes as Alicia Kitsing
 Sal Lopez as Felipe Hernandez
 Dana Lee as Ping, The Store Owner
 Anthony Hickox as Dr. Hickox

Production notes

The following production notes were noted in the October 1993 issue of Fangoria magazine (#127):

The film had a 24-day shooting schedule using two camera crews (one for principal photography, one for extensive 2nd-unit FX) at Santa Clarita Studios in Los Angeles, with Melrose Place filming next door.
Director/producer Brian Yuzna was disappointed with the lack of screen time for his previous female monster creation in Bride of Re-Animator and wanted "Julie" to have a far bigger presence.
Yuzna had been aiming to do a ROTLD sequel for years and was Trimark's first choice to direct.
Brian Peck ("Scuzz" in ROTLD and various zombies in ROTLD Part II) returns to play a government agent in this film.  He is the only actor to appear in all three films.
Julie's full zombie look required 100 different pieces, an application process that originally took nine hours but was eventually cut down to six, not including glamour make-up.
Five different FX companies (including Steve Johnson's XFX) were used during the shoot due to the tight schedule and number of effects in the film.
Hellraiser III and Waxwork director Anthony Hickox plays one of the government scientists who is killed early in the film by a test zombie.
The welded-metal exoskeleton worn by Riverman weighed 75 pounds and was designed by Tim Ralston.
The film was released unrated on VHS in addition to the R-rated theatrical cut.  Yuzna trimmed "between 50 and 60" minutes to get the R rating.

Reception
On review aggregator website Rotten Tomatoes, the film holds an approval rating of 55% based on 11 reviews and an average rating of 4.8/10. On Metacritic, Return of the Living Dead III scored 47 out of a 100 based on five critics, indicating "mixed or average reviews".

Entertainment Weeklys Benjamin Svetkey gave the film a grade of "B+", writing that, "it's chock-full of brain-munching zombies, campy dialogue, and gross anatomical effects–but it's that touch of amore that makes this one so special". Brian J. Dillard of AllMovie wrote, "Although it features the same vaguely punk-derived fashion sense and many of the same plot elements as its predecessors, the third effort in the Return of the Living Dead series lacks much of the goofy entertainment value of the previous installments". Zombiemania: 80 Movies to Die For author Arnold T. Blumberg wrote that "Clarke tries to make the most of her after-death angst", but the film was "little more than a twisted catalogue of fetishistic imagery for horror movie aficionados keen to have a female zombie they can actually find attractive."

In 2017, Return of the Living Dead III premiered at the London FrightFest Film Festival.

References

External links

1993 horror films
1993 fantasy films
1990s comedy horror films
1990s science fiction horror films
American body horror films
American romantic fantasy films
American science fiction horror films
American sequel films
Films directed by Brian Yuzna
Films set in 1993
Films shot in Los Angeles
Return of the Living Dead (film series)
Romantic horror films
Trimark Pictures films
Films scored by Barry Goldberg
1990s English-language films
1990s American films